Pack Up Your Troubles is a 1939 American comedy film directed by H. Bruce Humberstone and written by Lou Breslow and Owen Francis. The film stars Jane Withers, The Ritz Brothers, Lynn Bari, Joseph Schildkraut, Stanley Fields, Fritz Leiber and Lionel Royce. The film was released on October 20, 1939, by 20th Century Fox.

Plot
The Ritz Brothers join the army in the times of the First World War, they get sent to France with their unit and meet Colette, an orphan of an American mother and a French father. The sweet and courageous girl then proceeds to help the Allies.

Cast        
Jane Withers as Colette
The Ritz Brothers as The Ritz Brothers
Lynn Bari as Yvonne
Joseph Schildkraut as Hugo Ludwig
Stanley Fields as Sgt. Walker
Fritz Leiber as Pierre Ferrand
Lionel Royce as Gen. von Boech
Georges Renavent as Col. Giraud
Adrienne D'Ambricourt as Mme. Marchand
Leon Ames as Adjutant
Wilhelm von Brincken as Mueller 
Edward Gargan as Sentry
Robert Emmett Keane as Kane
Henry Victor as Col. Schlager

References

External links 
 

1939 films
1939 comedy films
American comedy films
1930s English-language films
Films directed by H. Bruce Humberstone
20th Century Fox films
Military humor in film
Western Front (World War I) films
American black-and-white films
Films produced by Sol M. Wurtzel
Films set in France
Films scored by Samuel Kaylin
1930s American films
English-language comedy films